Acanthocercus ugandaensis, the Uganda blue-headed tree agama, is a species of lizard in the family Agamidae. It is a small lizard found in Uganda and Tanzania.

References

Acanthocercus
Reptiles described in 1957
Taxa named by Wolfgang Klausewitz